Kjell Höglund (born 8 December 1945 in Östersund, Sweden) is a Swedish singer-songwriter.

Höglund, who found his musical breakthrough in the 1970s, is in his native country renowned for his mixture of realism, absurdism and surrealism.

In 1992 he was nominated for a Grammis award for best male pop.

Kjell Höglund has also published books with esoteric and pseudo-scientific content.  
Many of Höglund's beliefs presented in these works are similar to those of the Danish new age mystic Martinus.

Selected songs
 Jag hör hur dom ligger med varandra i våningen ovanför (Translation of title: I can hear them sleeping with each other in the flat above)
 Genesarets sjö (Translation of title: Lake of Gennesaret)
 Man vänjer sig (Translation of title: One gets used to it)
 Holländsk Genever (Translation of title: Dutch Gin)
 Häxprocessen (Translation of title: The witch process)
 Desertör (Translation of title: Deserter)
 Maskinerna är våra vänner (Translation of title: The machines are our friends)

Selected albums
 Undran (1971)
 Blomstertid (1972)
 Häxprocess (1973)
 Inkognito (1995)
 Kryptonit (2001)
 Pandoras ask (2006)
 Baskervilles hund ALP-4 (1974)
 Hjärtat sitter till vänster ALP-7 (1975) 
 Doktor Jekylls testamente ALP-11 (1979)
 Vägen mot Shangri-La ALP-12 (1980)
 Tidens tecken ALP-15/AMC-15/ACD-15 (1984) 
 Hemlig kärlek ALP-16/AMC-16 (1986)  
 Ormens år ALPCD-18 (1989) 
 Höglund Forever ALP-22/ACD-22 (1992) 
 Inkognito ACD-26 (1995)  
 Glöd ALP-17/ACD-17 (1988)
 Lokomotiv ACD-23 (1994)

Bibliography
 Brända skepp (1987)
 Magnum Opus (1991)
 Det sicilianska sigillet (1997)
 Genomträngningen (1999)
 Den förbjudna boken: en ny teori om Nostradamus profetior (2000)
 Det snöar i Edens lustgård (2005)
 Ando-Random Haglund (2013)

External links
 Kjell Höglund's web site (In Swedish)

1945 births
Living people
Swedish male singers
Swedish songwriters